Hebetancylus is a genus of small, freshwater, air-breathing limpets, aquatic pulmonate gastropod molluscs in the family Planorbidae, the ram's horn snails and their allies.

Anatomy 
These animals have a pallial lung, as do all pulmonate snails, but they also have a false gill or "pseudobranch" which can serve perfectly well as a gill when they are unable to reach the surface for air.

Species 
Species within the genus Hebetancylus include:

 Hebetancylus excentricus (Morelet, 1851)
 Hebetancylus moricandi (d’Orbigny, 1837)

References

Planorbidae